NeoGenomics Laboratories, Inc., also known as NeoGenomics or Neo, is a high-complexity CLIA-certified clinical laboratory, pharma services and information services company that specializes in cancer genetics diagnostic testing. The company's testing services include cytogenetics, fluorescence in situ hybridization (FISH), flow cytometry, immunohistochemistry, anatomic pathology, and molecular genetics.

Headquartered in Fort Myers, FL, NeoGenomics maintains a network of testing facilities across the US, with laboratories in Florida, California, Tennessee, and Texas.

History

NeoGenomics first received state and national-level laboratory certifications in 2002. Three years later in 2005, the company developed a technical-only service model using FISH. 

In 2013, the company launched its sequencing platform and was listed on the Nasdaq Stock Market as NEO. In 2014, NeoGenomics launched molecular tests including BTK and CALR mutation analysis.

Clarient is headquartered in Aliso Viejo, California; with an ancillary laboratory in Houston, Texas.

In November 2017, NeoGenomics established their first headquarters outside the United States in Rolle, Switzerland.

References

External links
NeoGenomics Homepage

Pharmaceutical companies of the United States
Biotechnology companies of the United States
Biotechnology companies established in 2002